Prince Daksinavat (10 July 1852 – 1853) was a Prince of Siam (later Thailand). He was a member of the Siamese royal family, a son of King Mongkut and Chao Chom Manda Phueng.

His mother was Chao Chom Manda Phueng (a daughter of In Indravimala). He was given the full name of Phra Chao Borom Wong Ther Phra Ong Chao Daksinavat

He had two younger brothers:
 Prince Gagananga Yukala
 Prince Jumbala Sombhoj

Prince Daksinavat died in 1853, aged one.

References 
https://sites.google.com/site/panyapon133am/phra-rachxors-laea-phra-rach-thida

1852 births
1853 deaths
Thai male Phra Ong Chao
Children of Mongkut
People from Bangkok
19th-century Thai royalty who died as children
19th-century Chakri dynasty
Sons of kings